Kartika Rane is an Indian television and film actress.

She studied sociology at Sophia College, Mumbai and since then entered into modelling and tele-advertising. She appeared in B. R. Chopra's comedy countdown show, Ek Se Badkar Ek. She was in the 1996 Hindi film Yash. Appeared in television  roles in 2001 television shows Kangan and Hum Pardesi Ho Gaye.

Rane is a native of Goa. Her uncle is Pratapsingh Rane,  the ex-Chief Minister of Goa.

Career
Filmography 
 1996 - Yash 
 2004 - Saatchya Aat Gharat 
 2008 - Hulla

Serials 
 2001 - Hum Pardesi Ho Gaye as Mallika 
 2001 - Kangan 
 Janam
 1999 - Didi Ka Dulha
 1999 - Captain Vyom as Maya/Chaya
 2000 - Gubare
 2000 - Nyaay
 Janam
 1996 - Ek Se Badh Kar Ek as Antara
 The Great Maratha as Mahadji Scindia's wife
 Rishtey- Highway (Episodic Role)
 Mahabharat Katha as Satyabhama
 1990 - Aurat (TV series)
 Aankhi ek Kahani - Sahyadri Marathi

References

External links

Indian film actresses
Living people
Year of birth missing (living people)